L'Hôpital is a commune in the Moselle department in Grand Est in north-eastern France.

It is the birthplace of the Slovenian author Mile Klopčič and historian France Klopčič.

Population

See also
 Communes of the Moselle department

References

External links
 

Hopital